Thomas Costello (born 1978) is an Irish hurler who played as a right corner-back for the Tipperary senior team.

Born in Cappawhite, County Tipperary, Thomas Costello first arrived on the inter-county scene at the age of seventeen when he first linked up with the Tipperary minor team, before later joining the under-21 side. He made his senior debut during the 2001 league. Costello went on to become a regular member of the team over the next few years, and won one All-Ireland medal, one Munster medal and one National Hurling League medal.

At club level Costello is a three-time divisional medallist with Cappawhite. Captain U21 team to County A title in 1999.

Throughout his career Costello made 17 championship appearances. He retired from inter-county hurling following the conclusion of the 2004 championship.

Honours

Team

Cappawhite
West Tipperary Senior Hurling Championship (3): 2000, 2001, 2005
Tipperary Under-21 Hurling Championship (1): 1999

Tipperary
All-Ireland Senior Hurling Championship (1): 2001
Munster Senior Hurling Championship (1): 2001
National Hurling League (1): 2001
 Railway Cup 2001
Munster Under-21 Hurling Championship (1): 1999
All-Ireland Minor Hurling Championship (1): 1996
Munster Minor Hurling Championship (1): 1996

References 

1978 births
Living people
Cappawhite hurlers
Tipperary inter-county hurlers
Tipperary inter-county Gaelic footballers
All-Ireland Senior Hurling Championship winners